The 2022 Cork Senior A Football Championship was the third staging of the Cork Senior A Football Championship since its establishment by the Cork County Board in 2020. The championship ran from 22 July and 30 October 2022.

The final was played on 30 October 2022 at Páirc Uí Chaoimh in Cork, between St. Michael's and Knocknagree, in what was their first meeting in a final in this grade. St. Michael's won the match by 2-07 to 0-06 to claim their first ever championship title.

O'Donovan Rossa's Kevin Davis was the championship's top scorer with 0-31.

Team changes

To Championship

Promoted from the Cork Premier Intermediate Football Championship
 Newmarket

Relegated from the Cork Premier Senior Football Championship
 Ilen Rovers

From Championship

Promoted to the Cork Premier Senior Football Championship
 Mallow

Relegated to the Cork Premier Intermediate Football Championship
 Bantry Blues

Group A

Group A table

Group A results

Group B

Group B table

Group B results

Group C

Group C table

Group C results

Knockout stage

Bracket

Relegation playoff

Quarter-finals

Semi-finals

Final

Championship statistics

Top scorers

Top scorer overall

In a single game

References

External links
 Cork GAA website

Cork Senior A Football Championship
Cork
Cork Senior A